Colacurcio is an Italian surname. Notable people with the surname include:

Frank Colacurcio (1917–2010), Italian American businessman and boss of the Seattle crime family known for running strip clubs in Seattle
Michael J. Colacurcio (born 1939), professor of English at UCLA specializing in American literature and literary history
Colacurcio crime family a.k.a. Seattle crime family, a crime family based in Seattle, Washington

Italian-language surnames